Levanta cola jeans (Spanish: jeans levanta cola, or "butt-lifting jeans") are women's jeans that enhance the buttocks. Originally developed in Colombia, they are especially popular among Latina women. Producers include YMI Jeans and others.

Description
Levanta cola jeans are typically very stretchy and in essence leggings that are designed to look like jeans. They are typically made of spandex and other materials in order to fit to the body's contours. As a result, they have the external appearance of being much smaller than regular jeans before being worn. The jeans are tight around the waist and legs, but the fabric around the buttocks is looser in order to give the wearer a "butt-lifting" look. Many of the jeans do not have back pockets. The jeans are also sometimes highly decorated with rhinestones and glitter.

History
Levanta cola jeans were first developed and produced in Colombia perhaps around the early 1990s. Gregorio José Rivera Quiroz was one of the first producers of these jeans. As a result, they are sometimes simply known in Spanish as jeans colombianos, or "Colombian jeans."

Colombia is the largest producer of levanta cola jeans. The jeans are most popular in Latin America (especially Mexico, Brazil, Peru and other neighboring countries) and the United States. Since the 2000s, they have also been gaining popularity in Europe and other parts of the world.

See also
Mom jeans
Slim-fit jeans
High rise
Wide-leg jeans
Daisy Dukes 
Denim skirt 
Designer jeans
Drainpipe jeans
Women and trousers

References

Jeans by type
Colombian clothing
Latin American clothing